César Miguel Rosales Tardío (born 9 November 1970 in Lima, Peru) is a former Peruvian footballer.

Club career
Rosales played for a number of clubs in Peru, including Ciclista Lima and Alianza Lima. He also had a spell with Paniliakos in the Greek Super League.

International career
Rosales made four appearances for the senior Peru national football team from 1994 to 1997.

References

External links
 

1970 births
Living people
Footballers from Lima
Association football midfielders
Peruvian footballers
Peru international footballers
1997 Copa América players
León de Huánuco footballers
Ciclista Lima Association footballers
Club Alianza Lima footballers
Paniliakos F.C. players
Kavala F.C. players
Vyzas F.C. players
Peruvian Primera División players
Super League Greece players
Peruvian expatriate footballers
Expatriate footballers in Greece